Pectic acid, also known as polygalacturonic acid, is a water-insoluble, transparent gelatinous acid existing in over-ripe fruit and some vegetables. It is a product of pectin degradation in plants, and is produced via the interaction between pectinase and pectin (the latter being common in the wine-making industry.) In the early stage of development of fruits, the pectic substance is a water-insoluble protopectin which is converted into pectin by the enzyme protopectinase during ripening of fruit. In over-ripe fruits, due to the presence of pectic methyl esterase enzyme, the pectin gets largely converted to pectic acid which is water-insoluble. Due to this reason both immature and over-ripe fruits are not suitable for making jelly and only ripe fruits are used.

References 

Carboxylic acids
Polysaccharides